DNA-binding protein inhibitor ID-3 is a protein that in humans is encoded by the ID3 gene.

Function 

Members of the ID family of helix-loop-helix (HLH) proteins lack a basic DNA-binding domain and inhibit transcription through formation of nonfunctional dimers that are incapable of binding to DNA.[supplied by OMIM]

Interactions 

ID3 (gene) has been shown to interact with TCF3.

Repressors of ID3 

BTG2 binds to the promoter of Id3 and represses its activity. By this mechanism, the upregulation of Id3 in the hippocampus caused by BTG2 ablation prevents terminal differentiation of hippocampal neurons.

See also 
 Inhibitor of DNA-binding protein

References

Further reading

External links 
 

Transcription factors